Saperda is a genus of flat-faced longhorn beetles belonging to the family Cerambycidae, subfamily Lamiinae. The genus was erected by Johan Christian Fabricius in 1775.

Species

 Saperda alberti Plavilstshikov, 1916
 Saperda bacillicornis Pesarini & Sabbadini, 1997
 Saperda balsamifera (Motschulsky, 1860)
 Saperda bilineatocollis Pic, 1924
 Saperda calcarata Say, 1824 - poplar borer 
 Saperda candida Fabricius, 1787 - roundheaded appletree borer 
 Saperda carcharias (Linnaeus, 1758)
 Saperda cretata Newman, 1838
 Saperda discoidea Fabricius, 1798
 Saperda facetula Holzschuh, 1999
 Saperda fayi Bland, 1863
 †Saperda florissantensis Wickham, 1916
 Saperda gilanensis (Shapovalov, 2013)
 Saperda gleneoides Breuning, 1950
 Saperda horni Joutel, 1902
 Saperda hosokawai Hasegawa, 2017
 Saperda imitans Felt & Joutel, 1904
 Saperda inornata Say, 1824
 Saperda internescalaris Pic, 1934
 Saperda interrupta Gebler, 1825
 Saperda kojimai Makihara & Nakamura, 1985
 Saperda lateralis Fabricius, 1775
 Saperda maculosa Ménétriés, 1832
 Saperda mariangelae Pesarini & Sabbadini, 2015
 Saperda messageei Breuning, 1962
 Saperda moesta LeConte, 1850
 Saperda mutica Say, 1824
 Saperda obliqua Say, 1826
 Saperda octomaculata Blessig, 1873
 Saperda octopunctata (Scopoli, 1772)
 Saperda ohbayashii Podany, 1963
 Saperda pallidipennis Gressitt, 1951
 Saperda perforata (Pallas, 1773)
 Saperda populnea (Linnaeus, 1758)
 Saperda punctata (Linnaeus, 1767)
 Saperda puncticollis Say, 1824
 Saperda quercus Charpentier, 1825
 †Saperda robusta (Schmidt, 1967)
 Saperda scalaris (Linnaeus, 1758)
 Saperda similis Laicharting, 1784
 Saperda simulans Gahan, 1888
 Saperda subobliterata Pic, 1910
 Saperda subscalaris Breuning, 1952
 Saperda tetrastigma Bates, 1879
 Saperda tridentata Olivier, 1795 - elm borer 
 Saperda vestita Say, 1824 - linden borer 
 Saperda viridipennis Gressitt, 1951

References
 "Saperda Fabricius, 1775". BioLib. Retrieved November 9, 2019.
 Cerambycoidea.com.

Saperda
Saperdini
Cerambycidae genera